"I've Got a Feeling (We'll Be Seeing Each Other Again)" is a song written by Carl Hampton and Homer Banks. It was a hit for Al Wilson in 1976.

Background
The single was released on Playboy Records in 1976. It was written by Carl Hampton and Homer Banks, and produced by Marc Gordon and arranged by H.B. Barnum. The B-side "Be Concerned" was produced by Herbert Santifer.

The record peaked at number 29 on the Billboard Hot 100 on May 15, 1976. It was listed at number 8 in the Soul Brothers Top 20, in the April 22, 1976 issue of Jet magazine.

In literature
The song is mentioned in My Breaking Point, God's Turning Point: Experience God's Amazing Power to Restore by Ricky Texada. The author recounts hearing the song on the radio in the summer of 1976 and singing it over and over, especially after meeting a young lady with big brown eyes.

References

1976 singles
Al Wilson (singer) songs
Songs written by Homer Banks
1976 songs
Playboy Records singles
Songs written by Carl Hampton